Festival is the fourth and final release by the band Jon Oliva's Pain. Released in February 2010 in Europe, it peaked at number 87 in the German MRC Radio Charts.

The record continues in using the works of the late Criss Oliva, the younger brother of the band's founder, Jon, like the two previous JOP albums. The track "Living on the Edge" is a reworking of a Savatage track that featured on bootleg records of the band.

Track listing

Personnel
Jon Oliva – lead vocals, piano, guitars, keyboards
Christopher Kinder – drums, percussion, vocals
Kevin Rothney – bass, vocals
Matt LaPorte – lead guitars, hammered dulcimer, vocals
Tom McDyne – guitars, vocals

Additional musicians 
Howard Helm – piano and keyboards
Casey Grillo – percussion
Tom Morris – guitar
Jim Morris – guitar
Laurian Mohai – guitar
Jason Blackerby – percussion
Dana Piper – guitar
Todd La Torre – backing vocals, hammered dulcimer on "Afterglow"

Further credits 
 Produced by Christopher Kinder, Jon Oliva and Tom Morris
 Recorded at Morrisound Studios in Tampa, Florida and Shabbey Road Studio's in Dunedin, Florida
 Engineered by Tom Morris, Christopher Kinder and Jason Blackerby
 Mixed by Tom Morris
 Mastered by Tom Morris and Christopher Kinder
 Orchestration: Jon Oliva, Howard Helm, Tom Morris and Christopher Kinder
 The Scarlett Pumpernickel Choir: Jesse Morris, Todd La Torre, Jason Blackerby, Kevin Rothney, Christopher Kinder, Tom McDyne and Matt LaPorte
 Art concept: Jon Oliva, Christopher Kinder
 CD artwork design by Thomas Ewerhard
 Photography by Eric Franguel

References

External links
 Jon Oliva's Pain's official web site
 Jon Oliva's Pain's at MySpace (with track samples of the album posted)

2010 albums
Jon Oliva's Pain albums
AFM Records albums